Dorothea is a feminine given name.

Places
339 Dorothea, an asteroid
Dorothea, U.S. Virgin Islands, a settlement
Dorothea Quarry, a flooded quarry in the Nantlle Valley, Gwynedd, Wales
Fort Dorothea, a late 17th-early 18th century settlement on the Brandenburger Gold Coast in west Africa

Ships
 HMS Santa Dorothea (1798), frigate
 USS Dorothea (1898), gunboat
 USS Dorothea L. Dix (AP-67), transport ship

Other uses
 "Dorothea" (song), a 2020 song by Taylor Swift

See also
Dorotea Municipality, Västerbotten County, Sweden
Dorotea, seat of the municipality
Dorothy (disambiguation)
Dorothee (given name)
Sophia Dorothea
Thea (name)
Tea (given name)